Lenner is a surname. Notable people with the surname include:

 Anne Lenner (1912–1997), English singer

See also
 Lennert (disambiguation)